Evil Dead is an American horror film franchise created by Sam Raimi consisting of five feature films and a television series. The series revolves around the Necronomicon Ex-Mortis, an ancient Sumerian text that wreaks havoc upon a group of cabin inhabitants in a wooded area in Tennessee.

The protagonist, Ashley Joanna "Ash" Williams (Bruce Campbell), is the only character to appear in every installment of the original trilogy, with the notable exception of his main love interest, Linda, who appears in Evil Dead II and Army of Darkness during only the prologues. The original trilogy includes The Evil Dead (1981), Evil Dead II (1987), and Army of Darkness (1992), all written and directed by Raimi, produced by Robert G. Tapert, and starring Campbell. The franchise has since expanded into other formats, including video games, comic books, a musical, and a television series.

The franchise was resurrected in 2013 with Evil Dead, both a reboot and a loose continuation of the series directed by Fede Álvarez, who cowrote the screenplay with Rodo Sayagues. It was produced by Raimi, Campbell, and Tapert, featuring new protagonist Mia Allen (Jane Levy), alongside her brother David Allen (Shiloh Fernandez), set sometime after Army of Darkness and Ash vs Evil Dead. A TV series called Ash vs Evil Dead premiered on cable network Starz in 2015, lasted for three seasons, and ended in 2018, with Campbell announcing an animated revival to be in active development in July 2022. It starred Bruce Campbell as Ash and was executive produced by Campbell, Sam Raimi, and Rob Tapert.

A new film in the franchise, titled Evil Dead Rise, is set to be theatrically released on April 21, 2023, with Lee Cronin serving as writer and director, Alyssa Sutherland and Lily Sullivan starring, and Tapert as a producer.

Films

Main films

The Evil Dead (1981) 

Filmed in 1979 and released in 1981, this is the first film in the series. It introduces the series' protagonist Ash, the Book of the Dead, and the Deadites.

Evil Dead II (1987) 

Released in 1987, this film is a sequel to the original, continuing where the last film ended (a recap of the previous film is shown in the beginning). This entry shows the horrors of Ash's continuing battle with the Necronomicon Ex-Mortis and the Deadites. It also introduces elements of slapstick humor that came to define the series.

Army of Darkness (1992) 

Filmed in 1991 and released in spring of 1993 in the United States, this is the third film in the franchise (and the last featuring Ash Williams taking a lead role so far), taking Ash back in time to England in 1300 AD. The movie has horror attributes, but is based mainly on slapstick and action.

Standalone films

Evil Dead (2013) 

Evil Dead is the title of a film that serves as a soft reboot and a continuation of the Evil Dead franchise. Unlike the first three films, this one does not feature the character of Ash Williams in a major role (Ash only appears briefly in a post-credits scene) and instead follows a new protagonist named Mia Allen. The film is considered a continuation of the franchise, and plans to feature both Ash and Mia in future installments have been discussed.

Evil Dead Rise (2023) 

In October 2019, Raimi announced at the New York Comic Con, that a new film was officially green-lit and in development. Robert G. Tapert was set to produce, while Raimi and Campbell served as executive producers only, all under their Ghost House Pictures banner. In June 2020, Lee Cronin was chosen as a director with a script he wrote. Raimi chose the filmmaker from a list of potential directors, to continue the franchise. Officially titled Evil Dead Rise, the project was announced to be developed by New Line Cinema and released on HBO Max. Principal photography commenced on June 6, 2021, in New Zealand. In May 2021, Alyssa Sutherland and Lily Sullivan had been cast in the film, followed by Gabrielle Echols, Morgan Davies, and Nell Fisher in June and Mia Challis in July. Cronin stated the production was half-way completed by July 2021, while filming concluded on October 27, 2021. The filmmaker stated that the project used over 6,500 liters of fake blood during production. Evil Dead Rise is scheduled to be theatrically released on April 21, 2023.

Short film

Within the Woods (1978)

A prototype short film, produced by Raimi on a micro-budget was developed to market his concept and acquire funding from producers and studios for a feature-length film. Titled, Within the Woods, the short was a meager success. Despite this, the release proceeded to spawn an entire franchise.

Development
In January 1978, Bruce Campbell was a college dropout who had just quit his job as a taxicab driver. Sam Raimi was studying literature at Michigan State University with Robert Tapert, who was finishing his economics degree. While putting the finishing touches on It's Murder!, Tapert suggested doing a feature-length film to Raimi. Raimi felt it impossible, stating that they could never acquire the funding. Campbell declared: "I could always move back home." Tapert feared a career in fisheries/wildlife while Raimi was afraid that he would have to go back to work at his dad's home furnishing store. These were the practical reasons that convinced the three to put forth a feature-length film. The three were big fans of the comedy genre, but they decided not to produce a comedy as they felt "a feature-length yuck fest just didn't compute". A well-noted scene from It's Murder moved Raimi to write the short film Clockwork. The three felt the result was very effective and represented a new direction that their films could take, that of a semi-successful horror film.

This would later lead to research of low-budget horror films at the local drive-in theater. The many films that they watched were the "two films for two dollars," allowing them the chance to document the behavior of what would become their target audience. Campbell said, "The message was very clear: Keep the pace fast and furious, and once the horror starts, never let up. 'The gorier the merrier' became our prime directive." Films they watched included Massacre at Central High and Revenge of the Cheerleaders. The idea to do a "prototype" was commissioned, to prove not only to themselves, but also to potential investors, that they were capable of doing a full-length horror film. The same year, at Michigan State, Raimi had been studying H. P. Lovecraft and was most impressed with Necronomicon, or simply The Book of the Dead. From these rough concepts, he concocted a short story where a group of four friends unwittingly dig up an Indian burial ground and unleash horrific spirits and demons. In the spring of 1978, filming of Within the Woods started over a three-day weekend, on a budget of $1,600.

Within the Woods, as well as serving as a prototype, had impressed the filmmakers. For a marketing strategy, a screening was arranged at their former high school, with a positive response.

Financing
Filming was first commissioned for the summer of 1979 in Michigan. In order to organize the budget, Sam Raimi, Robert Tapert and Bruce Campbell bought a few "how to make an independent film" guide publications. The budget was originally centered on $150,000 while shooting with a Super 8 camera. However, due to technical difficulties, it was decided to move it up to 16 mm format, as they wanted to film the project in the style of the many low-budget films at the time that had come out in the 1970s. Since they had little experience in the film industry, the three felt they should buy business suits and briefcases as a means to convince investors that they "had all the answers." A man named Andy Grainger, who was a friend of Tapert and owner of a series of movie theaters, was the first primary investor. He stated, "Fellas, no matter what, just keep the blood running." As a tribute to him, there's a scene in the finished film where an old film projector whirs to life and "projects" blood running down the screen.

Most importantly, Grainger provided the name of a distributor in New York City whom they could approach for possible distribution. The company was Levitt-Pickman Films, who most recently was famous for Groove Tube, starring a very young Chevy Chase. The filmmakers took a train at $40 each, as they knew none of their cars could make an entire round trip road trip. One of Campbell's old girlfriends named Andrea allowed them to stay at her apartment. Andrea's cat fell asleep on Raimi's face without even disturbing him, and Raimi, who is allergic to cats, had his eyes swollen shut.

Television

Ash vs Evil Dead (2015–2018)

The series stars Bruce Campbell reprising his role as an older Ash Williams with a supporting cast that includes Dana DeLorenzo, Ray Santiago, Lucy Lawless, and Jill Marie Jones. The series is executive produced by Campbell, Sam Raimi, and Rob Tapert. It premiered on Starz on October 31, 2015.

Ash vs Evil Dead proved to be a critically well-received television show, earning a 98% from Rotten Tomatoes. Four days before its premiere, the show was picked up for a second 10-episode season. The series lasted for three seasons (30 episodes) before it was canceled by Starz in April 2018. Following the series' cancellation, Bruce Campbell announced he was officially retired from portraying the character of Ash, although he would continue to voice the character in animation. Subsequently, on July 25, 2022, Campbell announced that an animated revival of Ash vs Evil Dead was in active development, with Campbell returning as the voice of Ash.

The 2021 episode of Creepshow, Public Television of the Dead, features the Necronomicon and Deadites. It also features Ted Raimi, Sam Raimi's brother who portrays the Deadite Henrietta in Evil Dead 2 and Ash vs. Evil Dead.

Main cast and characters
 This table only shows characters that have appeared in three or more films in the series.
 A dark gray cell indicates that the character was not in the film or that the character's presence in the film has yet to be announced.
 An  indicates an appearance through archival footage or stills.
 A  indicates a cameo role.
 An  indicates the actor was part of the main cast for the season.
 An  indicates a role shared with another actor.
 A  indicates an uncredited role.
 A  indicates a voice-only role.

Additional crew and production details

Reception

Box office performance

Critical and public response

Other media

Video games
There have been multiple Evil Dead video games:
 The Evil Dead (1984) for Commodore 64 and ZX Spectrum
 Evil Dead: Hail to the King (2000) for PlayStation, Dreamcast, and PC
 Evil Dead: A Fistful of Boomstick (2003) for PlayStation 2 and Xbox
 Evil Dead Pinball (2003) for mobile
 Evil Dead: Regeneration (2005) for PlayStation 2, Xbox, and PC
 Army of Darkness: Defense (2011) for iOS and Android
 Evil Dead: The Game (2011) for iOS
 Evil Dead: Endless Nightmare (2016) for iOS and Android
 Evil Dead: Virtual Nightmare (2018) for Oculus Go
 Evil Dead: The Game (2022) for PlayStation 4 and 5, Xbox Series X/S, Xbox One, Nintendo Switch, and PC

Ash Williams also appears as a playable character, along with Kelly and Pablo from the Ash vs. Evil Dead TV series, in Deploy and Destroy, a competitive multiplayer FPS available for iOS and Android, and also as a non-playable character in Telltale Games' game Poker Night 2. He also appears as a playable character in the asymmetrical horror game Dead by Daylight and as a skin in Fortnite.

Comic books

Dark Horse Comics
In 1992, Dark Horse Comics produced a mini-series adaptation of Army of Darkness adapted and illustrated by John Bolton. A trade paperback of this series was released by Dynamite Entertainment on September 25, 2006.

In 2008, Dark Horse revisited the franchise with a four issue adaptation of The Evil Dead written by Mark Verheiden and once again illustrated by John Bolton.

Dynamite Entertainment
In 2004, Dynamite Entertainment acquired the license to publish titles based on Army of Darkness and, in conjunction with Devil's Due Publishing, released the Army of Darkness: Ashes 2 Ashes mini-series. A second mini-series, Army of Darkness: Shop till You Drop Dead followed in 2005. Later that year, Dynamite separated itself from Devil's Due and began focusing entirely on self-published titles featuring the Army of Darkness franchise. This included an ongoing series that began in 2005 and saw Ash battling other horror icon such as Herbert West and Dracula. The series lasted thirteen issues before being rebooted with a second volume in 2007. The second series lasted twenty-seven issues before coming to an end. Over the years, there have also been several one-shot specials as well as crossovers with a wide variety of characters such as, Marvel Zombies, Darkman, Freddy Krueger, Jason Voorhees, Xena, Danger Girl and even Barack Obama. The series was then rebooted in 2013 and started over from the last scene in titular film because Ash misspoke the words S-Mart was sent back in time to the Medieval times where the wiseman has been possessed, Ash fights through many battles with the same characters from the film. At the end of this series Ash proposes to Sheila, in the next series "Ash gets hitched" they get married but Ash gets sent forward in time when he accidentally speaks a phrase that opens up a vortex. He wants to get back to Sheila but runs into many situations causing delays, he is currently in space fighting the evil.

Space Goat Productions
In 2015, Space Goat Productions acquired the license to publish titles based on Evil Dead 2. The company has released, or was planning on releasing, the following titles:
 Evil Dead 2: Beyond Dead By Dawn, a three-issue mini-series which debuted in June 2015
 Evil Dead 2: Tales of the Ex-Mortis, a three-issue anthology which debuted in August 2015.
 Evil Dead 2: Cradle of the Damned, a three-issue mini-series which debuted in January 2016
 A series of Evil Dead 2: Revenge of ... one-shots, which began with Hitler in March 2016 and will be followed by Dracula, the Martians, Jack the Ripper and Krampus
 Evil Dead 2: Dark Ones Rising, a three-issue mini-series which will debut in August 2016
Evil Dead 2: The official board game, a board game made about the film.
The official board game was funded through Kickstarter in 2018, but Space Goat Productions never produced the game, nor refunded money to the investors. They ceased all communications with customers and investors that year and refused to discuss the game with media.

Freddy vs. Jason vs. Ash
In the documentary "The Untold Saga of The Evil Dead" Rob Tapert states that New Line Cinema and Warner Bros. Pictures wanted to do Ash vs. Freddy vs. Jason: "We thought about it for one second but we knew we would have totally trashed the franchise in doing that, in that there would be no reason to reunite Bruce and Sam for Evil Dead 4 whatever that would be nor would there be any reason to go back and reinvent the original Evil Dead with a hot new filmmaker". Two comic book series were produced based on this concept, titled Freddy vs. Jason vs. Ash, and Freddy vs. Jason vs. Ash: The Nightmare Warriors.

Musical

The production team of George Reinblatt, Christopher Bond and Frank Cipolla created an Off Broadway show titled Evil Dead: The Musical, based on the film series. Its New York run was directed by Bond and Hinton Battle, who also choreographed the show. Ryan Ward played the part of Ash. Tying in with the midnight movie plot of a group of friends visiting a wooded cabin and unleashing untold evil, performances did not start until 11 p.m. on Fridays and Saturdays. Previews began October 1 and the show opened November 1 at the New World Stages. It was announced on January 31, 2007, that Evil Dead: The Musical'''s New York production at New World Stages would close on February 17, 2007. Toronto producers announced a new Toronto production of the show, also starring Ryan Ward, at the Diesel Playhouse. The new production started its running May 1, 2007, and has been announced to end on September 8, 2007, which won the Dora Audience Choice Award and praised by the Toronto Star.

In 2017, the English comedian Rob Kemp created and performed the stage show The Elvis Dead, a retelling of Evil Dead II in the style of Elvis Presley.

Legacy
In Italy, The Evil Dead was released under the title La Casa ("The House") and Evil Dead II became La Casa II. These were followed by three unrelated movies: Umberto Lenzi's La Casa 3 (a.k.a. Ghosthouse) (1988), Fabrizio Laurenti's La Casa 4 (a.k.a. Witchery) (1988) and Claudio Fragasso's La Casa 5 (a.k.a. Beyond Darkness) (1990). This is similar to what has happened in George A. Romero's Living Dead series starting with Zombi 2. House II: The Second Story (1987) and The Horror Show (1989) were retitled La Casa 6 and La Casa 7, respectively, in their Italian releases.Evil Dead influenced numerous directors, such as Peter Jackson and Edgar Wright, and inspired films such as Shaun of the Dead, The Cabin in the Woods, Bubba Ho-Tep, Dead Alive, Dead Snow, Ghosthouse, and Tucker & Dale vs. Evil. The Cabin in the Woods features many references to the film and even features Deadites and the possessed trees, although this is considered more a reference than a direct sequel. In 2020, Steve Villenevue premiered the documentary Hail to the Deadites, which focuses on the franchise's fandom and legacy. It features interviews from people involved with the film, such as Bruce Campbell, as well as with fans.

The Evil Dead films and the character of Ash influenced 1990s first-person shooter video games such as Doom, Duke Nukem 3D, and Blood. Duke Nukem quotes so many lines from Ash that Bruce Campbell stated that he was angered by not being paid for them.November 5, 1999 IGN For Men Interview: Bruce Campbell Evil Dead was cited as an inspiration for the original Doom.

Bruce Campbell directed and starred in a film titled My Name Is Bruce. It does not continue the story of Army of Darkness but is a fictionalized portrayal of Bruce living his everyday life in which he is erroneously believed to be as heroic as the Ash character and is hired to fight an ancient spirit. The film was released to a limited number of theaters on October 26, 2008, and was released on DVD and Blu-ray on February 10, 2009.

Lawsuits
Awards Pictures, a company that attempted to begin a new line of movies in the series in 2004, announced plans in May 2012 to film an Evil Dead 4, one that has nothing to do with the original films. Because of this, Sam Raimi sued Awards Pictures in an attempt to stop them from making said film, due to his own plan to someday film one himself. In August 2012, U.S. District Judge Dale Fischer entered a default judgment that "permanently enjoined" Awards Pictures from using the names Evil Dead, Evil Dead: Genesis of the Necronomicon, Evil Dead: Genesis of the Necronomicon, Part 2 or Evil Dead: Consequences'' "as or as part of the title of a motion picture, television program, video game, play, book or any other form of entertainment provided or to be provided through any media."

References

 
Horror film franchises
Fantasy film franchises
Comedy film franchises
Demons in film
Action film franchises
Films adapted into comics
Films adapted into television shows
Film series introduced in 1978